The Devil's Rain is a 1975 supernatural horror film directed by Robert Fuest. The ensemble cast includes William Shatner, Tom Skerritt, Ernest Borgnine, Eddie Albert, Ida Lupino, and Keenan Wynn. Additionally, John Travolta made his film debut in a minor role. Satanist Anton LaVey is credited as the film's technical advisor and appeared in the film playing a minor role. Although it takes place in an unspecified part of the American Southwest, the movie was shot in Durango, Mexico.

Plot 
A curse affects the Preston family, caused by their betrayal of the Satanic priest Jonathan Corbis in colonial New England. Corbis has harassed the Preston family for generations to obtain a book containing the signatures of the members of his cult which bind their souls to Satan. Corbis captures patriarch Steve Preston, who is allowed to escape to warn his wife Emma and son Mark. He tells them to give the book to Corbis, before melting into a waxy substance. Mark advises Emma to keep the book hidden and entrusts her to family friend John. However, moments after he leaves to meet Corbis, he hears Emma scream and returns to find the Satanists have abducted Emma, leaving John bound, hanging by his feet and terrified.

In a ghost town in the desert, Mark challenges Corbis to a battle of faith. Corbis leads Mark to his cult's church where he reveals that Emma has joined them, as reflected by her now eyeless face. When Mark refuses to do the same, he is surrounded and overwhelmed by Corbis's followers.

Sheriff Owens scoffs at John's story of eyeless cultists living in a long-deserted town and refuses to conduct a search for the three missing Prestons, so Mark's older brother, Tom, and his wife Julie search for them on their own. In the ghost town they are attacked by Satanists. After escaping, Tom sends Julie to summon the authorities while he returns to rescue Mark. En route, Julie is captured by a Satanist who was waiting in her car.

Wearing the robe of a defeated Satanist, Tom infiltrates Corbis's church, where Corbis performs a ceremony to convert Mark into one of his eyeless minions. Tom is discovered by the Satanists, but eludes capture. He and Dr. Sam Richards, a psychic researcher, review the book, which explains that the source of Corbis's power is an ornate glass bottle known as "The Devil's Rain", which contains the souls of Corbis's disciples. They also find Mark's signature in the book, which Richards is sure was not there the last time Mark had the book.

Tom and Richards head to Corbis's church and remove The Devil's Rain from its hiding place. The Satanists converge on the church, so Tom and Richards retreat, taking The Devil's Rain but leaving behind the book, which is taken by Corbis. As Corbis begins the ceremony to convert Julie to an eyeless one, Tom jumps in to intervene, and is captured as well. Richards threatens to destroy The Devil's Rain, but is overpowered by the Satanists, and Mark takes the Devil's Rain from him. Richards tells Mark that he can still save his soul by destroying the bottle, while Corbis maintains that if the bottle is destroyed Mark will wander through nothingness for eternity, unable to enter either Heaven or Hell. Mark smashes the bottle. The Devil's Rain is released from the bottle, melting the Satanists (including Mark and Corbis) and burning down the church. Tom and Julie make a hasty exit. As Tom embraces Julie, it is revealed that he is actually embracing Corbis, and that his wife's soul has become trapped within a new Devil's Rain.

Cast 
 Ernest Borgnine as Jonathan Corbis: The head priest of the Satanist cult. Borgnine appeared in the film fresh off of his successes with The Poseidon Adventure and Emperor of the North Pole.
 Eddie Albert as Dr. Sam Richards: A psychic researcher who aids the Preston family. The Devil's Rain came in the short interval between Albert's starring runs on Green Acres and Switch.
 William Shatner as Mark Preston: The younger son of the Preston family; though devoutly Christian, he is forcibly converted to the Satanist cult. The Devil's Rain was one of several B-films in which Shatner starred between the original Star Trek television series (1966-69) and Star Trek: The Motion Picture (1979).
 Ida Lupino as Emma Preston: The matriarch of the Preston family.
 Tom Skerritt as Tom Preston: The elder son of the Preston family, who sets out to rescue his mother and brother from the Satanists.
 Joan Prather as Julie Preston
 Keenan Wynn as Sheriff Owens
 John Travolta as Danny, a member of the Satanist cult
 George Sawaya as Steve Preston
 Anton LaVey as High Priest of the Church of Satan
 Diane LaVey as Priscilla Corbis
 Woodrow Chambliss as John
 Lisa Todd as Lilith

Release 
The Devil's Rain was released in 1975, with screenings in New York on August 7 and Los Angeles on August 13, 1975.

In 2017, Severin Films released The Devil's Rain on Blu-ray, featuring a 2K restoration from the film's original interpositive as well as various special features.

Reception 
The Devil's Rain received a uniformly negative critical response, with the chief complaint being the incoherent storyline. The film's lack of adequate scares was also widely criticized. Vincent Canby in The New York Times opined that "The Devil's Rain is ostensibly a horror film, but it barely manages to be a horror ... It is as horrible as watching an egg fry." Roger Ebert in the Chicago Sun-Times said "All of this would be good silly fun if the movie weren't so painfully dull. The problem is that the material's stretched too thin. There's not enough here to fill a feature-length film." He particularly derided the exhaustive melting of the Satanists at the finale. He gave the film 1½ stars out of four, and eventually added it to his "Most Hated" movies list.

In his 2010 book Showgirls, Teen Wolves, and Astro Zombies, Australian film reviewer Michael Adams called The Devil's Rain "the ultimate cult movie ... It's about a cult, has a cult following, was devised with input from a cult leader, and saw a future superstar indoctrinated into a cult he'd help popularize." The last reference is to John Travolta and Scientology.

See also 
 List of American films of 1975

Notes

External links 
 
 
 

1975 films
1975 horror films
Mexican supernatural horror films
American supernatural horror films
English-language Mexican films
Films directed by Robert Fuest
American ghost films
Films about Satanism
Films about cults
1970s English-language films
1970s American films
1970s Mexican films